The 2003 TD Waterhouse Cup was a men's tennis tournament played on outdoor hard courts at the Hamlet Golf and Country Club in Jericho, New York in the United States and was part of the International Series of the 2003 ATP Tour. The tournament ran from August 18 through August 24, 2003. Paradorn Srichaphan won the singles title.

Finals

Singles

 Paradorn Srichaphan defeated  James Blake 6–2, 6–4
 It was Srichaphan's 2nd title of the year and the 4th of his career.

Doubles

 Robbie Koenig /  Martín Rodríguez defeated  Martin Damm /  Cyril Suk 6–3, 7–6(7–4)
 It was Koenig's 2nd title of the year and the 4th of his career. It was Rodríguez's only title of the year and the 3rd of his career.

References 

TD Waterhouse Cup
Connecticut Open (tennis)